Admiral Clement Greatorex  (7 January 1869 – 21 March 1937) was a Royal Navy officer.

Naval career
Promoted to captain on 31 December 1905, Greatorex was given command of the protected cruiser HMS Eclipse in January 1906 and the armoured cruiser HMS Natal in June 1911. He was appointed Director of Naval Equipment at the Admiralty from 14 January 1915 to 8 October 1917. Promoted to the rank of Rear-Admiral he was then appointed Flag Officer, Shetlands in October 1917. During the First World War.

References

Royal Navy admirals
1869 births
1937 deaths
Companions of the Order of the Bath
Members of the Royal Victorian Order